St. Peter’s Church is the largest Catholic church in Karachi, Sindh, Pakistan.

Construction
The church was built in 11 months, covers an area of 1,858 square meters and can seat 5,000 people. It stands over 24 meters in height. All the windows are of stained glass depicting different religious events. It cost US$3.8 million to build.

Opening
The Apostolic Nuncio to Pakistan Archbishop Edgar Pena Parra blessed the church at a Mass concelebrated by 37 priests from around the country. The Apostolic Nuncio read a message of Pope Benedict XVI to Pakistani Catholics. Later the Papal Nuncio also blessed the Perpetual Adoration Chapel, a room built of glass in a corner of the church open for prayer 24 hours of the day.

Miscellaneous
The church will cater to the people of Akhtar Colony, Mahmudabad, Kashmir Colony and Manzoor Colony.

Funding for the project came from the Pontifical Mission Societies, Missio, the Rothenberg diocese in Germany and the Italian Bishop’s Conference.

References

Roman Catholic churches in Karachi
Roman Catholic churches completed in 2011
21st-century Roman Catholic church buildings
2011 establishments in Pakistan